Vasile Mihai Petra (born 12 January 1994) is a Romanian professional footballer who plays as a midfielder for Liga III side AFC Odorheiu Secuiesc.

Honours
Odorheiu Secuiesc
Liga III: 2021–22

References

External links
 
 

1994 births
Living people
Romanian footballers
Liga I players
Liga II players
Liga III players
ASA 2013 Târgu Mureș players
FC Brașov (1936) players
FC UTA Arad players
CSM Ceahlăul Piatra Neamț players
Association football midfielders